The 2023 Sokoto State gubernatorial election will take place on 18 March 2023, to elect the Governor of Sokoto State, concurrent with elections to the Sokoto State House of Assembly as well as twenty-seven other gubernatorial elections and elections to all other state houses of assembly. The election—which was postponed from its original 11 March date—will be held three weeks after the presidential election and National Assembly elections. Incumbent PDP Governor Aminu Waziri Tambuwal is term-limited and cannot seek re-election to a third term.

Party primaries were scheduled for between 4 April and 9 June 2022 with the Peoples Democratic Party nominating former Secretary to the State Government Saidu Umar on 25 May while the All Progressives Congress nominated former Deputy Governor Ahmad Aliyu on 26 May.

Electoral system
The Governor of Sokoto State is elected using a modified two-round system. To be elected in the first round, a candidate must receive the plurality of the vote and over 25% of the vote in at least two-thirds of state local government areas. If no candidate passes this threshold, a second round will be held between the top candidate and the next candidate to have received a plurality of votes in the highest number of local government areas.

Background
Sokoto State is a large northwestern state with agricultural and energy potential but facing a debilitated health sector, low education rates, and intense challenges in security as the nationwide kidnapping epidemic, bandit conflict, religious riots, and herder–farmer clashes have all heavily affected the state.

Politically, the 2019 elections were categorized as a swing back towards the PDP in the aftermath of Waziri Tambuwal's 2018 defection back to the party. Although Buhari won the state again, Sokoto was the state that swung the most towards the PDP in the presidential election; legislatively, the PDP held its one Senate seat after a court ruling and won four House of Representatives seats after the APC won all legislative seats in 2015. Statewise, Waziri Tambuwal won re-election by only about 300 votes while the APC won a narrow majority in the House of Assembly. During the term, APC dissenters worked with the PDP to form House of Assembly majority before eventually defecting and giving the PDP full control of the House.

Ahead of his term, Waziri Tambuwal's inauguration speech focused on education, healthcare, agriculture, water development, and transportation. In terms of his performance, Waziri Tambuwal was commended for improving girl-child and technical education while being criticized for baselessly denying National Bureau of Statistics poverty data, rapidly returning to out-of-state campaigning days after May 2022 religious riots, and rising insecurity.

Primary elections
The primaries, along with any potential challenges to primary results, were to take place between 4 April and 3 June 2022 but the deadline was extended to 9 June. An informal zoning gentlemen's agreement sets the Sokoto East Senatorial District to have the next governor as Sokoto East has not held the governorship since 2007. However, no major party has closed their nomination to non-Easterners as of yet.

All Progressives Congress 
The year prior to the APC primaries was beset by party infighting between three factions each supported by House of Representatives member Abdullahi Balarabe Salame, Minister Mohammed Maigari Dingyadi and former Governor Aliyu Magatakarda Wamakko, or former Senator and potential gubernatorial candidate Abubakar Umar Gada which culminated in three parallel party congresses in October 2021. The party crisis and legal battle over the congresses' legitimacy led no Sokoto APC chairman to be recognized in February 2022 alongside other state APC chairmen and for Sokoto delegates to be barred from the March APC National Convention. It was not until seven months after the congresses that a party executive was inaugurated after a court ruled in favor of the Maigari Dingyadi-Magatakarda Wamakko faction in late March and the leadership was sworn in on 29 March. The loss led House of Assembly Speaker Aminu Manya Achida (who had sided with Umar Gada's faction) to defect to the PDP; the protracted party crisis along with more potential defections have the potential to hurt the APC in the general election.

In the days before the primary, disputes emerged over the delegate list as now-candidate Balarabe Salame accused three local government party organizations of selecting delegates without a congress. On primary day, Balarabe Salame and former Senator Abubakar Umar Gada withdrew in protest of the process and three other candidates staged a walkout as several delegates claimed that unknown people were impersonating other delegates. Voting continued into the morning of 27 May and ended in the nomination of Ahmad Aliyu—a former Deputy Governor and the party's 2019 nominee—by a wide margin. Aliyu called for party unity in his acceptance speech and thanked party national chairman Abdullahi Adamu. However, about a month after the primary, the trio of Balarabe Salame, Yusuf Sulaiman, and Abubakar Abdullahi Gumbi defected to the PDP. A few weeks later, former commissioner Idris Muhammad Gobir was announced as Aliyu's running mate.

Nominated 
 Ahmad Aliyu: former Nigeria Police Trust Fund Executive Secretary (2020–2022), 2019 APC gubernatorial nominee, and former Deputy Governor (2015–2018)
 Running mate—Idris Muhammad Gobir: former Commissioner for Budget and Economic Planning and former Sabon Birni Sole Administrator

Eliminated in primary 
 Abubakar Abdullahi Gumbi: retired civil servant (defected after the primary to the PDP)
 Abdullahi Ibrahim Gobir: Senator for Sokoto East (2011–present)
 Faruk Malami Yabo: Ambassador to Jordan (2021–present), 2019 APC gubernatorial candidate and deputy gubernatorial nominee, former Commissioner of Local Government and Community Development (2012–2015), and former Commissioner of Finance (2007–2012)
 Yusuf Sulaiman: former Minister of Transport (2011) and former Minister of Sports (2011) (defected after the primary to the PDP)

Withdrew 
 Abdullahi Balarabe Salame: House of Representatives member for Gwadabawa/Illela (2011–present), former House of Assembly member for Gwadabawa East (2007–2011), former Speaker of the House of Assembly (2007–2011), and former Acting Governor (2008) (defected after the primary to the PDP)
 Abubakar Umar Gada: former Senator for Sokoto East (2007–2011)

Declined 
 Ibrahim Abdullahi Danbaba: Senator for Sokoto South (2015–2019; 2019–present) and former Deputy Governor (1999–2003)
 Mas'ud Musa Bashar: businessman
 Abubakar Shehu Tambuwal: former Senator for Sokoto South (2019)

Results

People's Democratic Party 

On the primary date, every candidates except former Secretary to the State Government Saidu Umar withdrew from the race to support Umar's emergence as the consensus nominee. The nomination of Umar via consensus was confirmed later that day, with Waziri Tambuwal claiming that it was a positive step for party unity along with announcing that withdrawn candidates like Manir Dan Iya and Sagir Bafarawa would receive other nominations in exchange for their withdrawals. However, former candidate Muktar Shagari left the PDP in protest of the Umar's nomination. By July, Dan Iya had obtained the Sokoto North PDP senatorial nomination while Umar had picked Bafarawa as his running mate.

Nominated 
 Saidu Umar: former Secretary to the State Government (2019–2022) and former Commissioner of Finance (2015–2019)
 Running mate—Sagir Bafarawa: former Commissioner of Environment (2019–2022) and son of former Governor Attahiru Bafarawa

Withdrew 
 Mohammed Bello Aliyu Goronyo: state PDP Chairman and former commissioner
 Sagir Bafarawa: former Commissioner of Environment (2019–2022) and son of former Governor Attahiru Bafarawa
 Umar Bature: PDP National Organizing Secretary (2021–present), former commissioner, and former House of Representatives member for Sokoto North/Sokoto South
 Manir Dan Iya: Deputy Governor (2018–present) and former Commissioner of Local Government and Chieftaincy Affairs (2015–2018; 2019–2022)
 Muktar Shagari: former Deputy Governor (2007–2015), former Minister of Water Resources (2001–2007), and nephew of former President Shehu Shagari

Declined 
 Umar Isa Ajiya: Nigerian National Petroleum Corporation official and in-law of former Governor Attahiru Bafarawa
 Abdussamad Dasuki: former Commissioner of Finance (2019–2022), former House of Representatives member for Kebbe/Tambuwal (2015–2019), and former House of Assembly member for Tambuwal East (2011–2015)
 Garba Ila Gada: 2012 DPP gubernatorial nominee, former Senator for Sokoto North (1992–1993), and former Commissioner of Economic Planning
 Ahmad Muhammad Gusau: former Deputy Governor

Results

Minor parties 

 Ahmad Jao Ahmad (Action Alliance)
Running mate: Umar Abdullahi
 Ibrahim Muhammad Liman (Action Democratic Party)
Running mate: Aliyu Hussaini Muawuya
 Sidi Ahmed Abba (Action Peoples Party)
Running mate: Hannatu Mukhtar
 Ahmad Babajo Ibrahim (African Action Congress)
Running mate: Murtala Sani
 Bello Isiyaku (African Democratic Congress)
Running mate: Zakari Halilu Gobir
 Haruna Abubakar (Allied Peoples Movement)
Running mate: Hauwa'u Bello
 Ibrahim Muhammed Mansur Gada (All Progressives Grand Alliance)
Running mate: Bello Wadata
 Ibrahim Goronyo (Boot Party)
Running mate: Zayyanu Sahabi
 Aminu Ahmad Umar (Labour Party)
Running mate: Hamisu Isah
 Umaru Dahiru (New Nigeria Peoples Party)
Running mate: Ibrahim Ango
 Sulaiman Dandauda Aliyu (National Rescue Movement)
Running mate: Mohammad Basheer Tanimu
 Muhammad Saidu Gumburawa (People's Redemption Party)
Running mate: Ismaila Na'Allah
 Abubakar Umar Gada (Social Democratic Party)
Running mate: Kabir Umar Dansuki
 Usama Sani Daniya (Young Progressives Party)
Running mate: Bello Ibrahim
 Habibu Mohammed (Zenith Labour Party)
Running mate: Mohammed Ibrahim

Campaign
Immediately after the primaries, pundits focused on the fallout from the elections and alleged imposition of nominees. As the general election campaign began in mid-2022, observers noted the potential impact of divisions within the state and national PDP on Umar's campaign due to significant disputes between Tambuwal and other major PDP figures. However, pundits also said most unsuccessful PDP gubernatorial aspirants had been successfully placated while the APC primary led to lingering resentment against former Governor Aliyu Magatakarda Wamakko—who was accused of imposing Aliyu as nominee. On the other hand, analysis in September noted that there had been notable defections from both major parties along with a report that Deputy Governor and former PDP gubernatorial candidate Manir Dan Iya could join the APC. After the start of the official campaign period in October, APC and PDP began public attack statements; it began with the APC accusing the PDP of threatening businessmen, traditional leaders, and religious Leaders to force them to support PDP candidates. In response, the PDP denied the accusations while stating that Wamakko had disrespected traditional leaders during his term as governor.

In late November, analysis from The Nation mentioned the competitiveness of the race while reiterating the potential damage from divides within each major party. Observers also noted similarities between the APC and PDP tickets in terms of regional balance and godfather support. Similarly, reporting from the Premium Times from the next month focused on Wamakko's influence on the state APC in opposition to his longtime rival Attahiru Bafarawa's influence on the state PDP. Meanwhile, a election overview from the Daily Trust contended that Umar could be hurt by Tambuwal's position in the campaign of PDP presidential nominee Atiku Abubakar. The January piece also cast doubts on the viability of other candidates like Aminu Ahmad Umar (LP) or Umaru Dahiru (NNPP). Later that month, ThisDay reporting confirmed that the APC had not formally commenced its campaign or formed a campaign council with the election only a month away. However, both major candidates were campaigning extensively; tension rose entering February due to a rise on political violence, including attacks on the convoys of both major candidates.

Campaign
Immediately after the primaries, pundits focused on the fallout from the elections and alleged imposition of nominees. As the general election campaign began in mid-2022, observers noted the potential impact of divisions within the state and national PDP on Umar's campaign due to significant disputes between Tambuwal and other major PDP figures. However, pundits also said most unsuccessful PDP gubernatorial aspirants had been successfully placated while the APC primary led to lingering resentment against former Governor Aliyu Magatakarda Wamakko—who was accused of imposing Aliyu as nominee. On the other hand, analysis in September noted that there had been notable defections from both major parties along with a report that Deputy Governor and former PDP gubernatorial candidate Manir Dan Iya could join the APC. After the start of the official campaign period in October, APC and PDP began public attack statements; it began with the APC accusing the PDP of threatening businessmen, traditional leaders, and religious Leaders to force them to support PDP candidates. In response, the PDP denied the accusations while stating that Wamakko had disrespected traditional leaders during his term as governor.

In late November, analysis from The Nation mentioned the competitiveness of the race while reiterating the potential damage from divides within each major party. Observers also noted similarities between the APC and PDP tickets in terms of regional balance and godfather support. Similarly, reporting from the Premium Times from the next month focused on Wamakko's influence on the state APC in opposition to his longtime rival Attahiru Bafarawa's influence on the state PDP. Meanwhile, a election overview from the Daily Trust contended that Umar could be hurt by Tambuwal's position in the campaign of PDP presidential nominee Atiku Abubakar. The January piece also cast doubts on the viability of other candidates like Aminu Ahmad Umar (LP) or Umaru Dahiru (NNPP). Later that month, ThisDay reporting confirmed that the APC had not formally commenced its campaign or formed a campaign council with the election only a month away. However, both major candidates were campaigning extensively; tension rose entering February due to a rise on political violence, including attacks on the convoys of both major candidates.

Later in February, attention largely switched to the nearing presidential election on 25 February. In the election, Sokoto State narrowly voted for Atiku Abubakar (PDP); Abubakar won the state with 49.2% of the vote, beating Bola Tinubu's 48.6%. Aside from the presidential result, the legislative elections were also very close and mainly inconcisive. These results led analysts to focus on the state's competitiveness.

Projections

Conduct

Electoral timetable

General election

Results

By senatorial district 
The results of the election by senatorial district.

By federal constituency
The results of the election by federal constituency.

By local government area 
The results of the election by local government area.

See also 
 2023 Nigerian elections
 2023 Nigerian gubernatorial elections

Notes

References 

Sokoto State gubernatorial election
2023
2023 Sokoto State elections
Sokoto